The Foster Hardware Building (also known as the Terry Office Supply Building) is a historic building located in Paintsville, Kentucky, United States. The building was constructed in 1904 by the Foster Hardware Company, which was the antecedent firm to former local wholesale firm, Big Sandy Hardware. On August 29, 2018, the rear portion of the building suffered severe structural damage, when the outer walls collapsed.

See also

National Register of Historic Places listings in Johnson County, Kentucky

References

Commercial buildings completed in 1904
National Register of Historic Places in Johnson County, Kentucky
Commercial buildings on the National Register of Historic Places in Kentucky
1904 establishments in Kentucky
Neoclassical architecture in Kentucky
Hardware stores of the United States
Paintsville, Kentucky